Myhre is a Norwegian surname. Notable people with the surname include:

Aslak Sira Myhre (born 1973), Norwegian politician
Erling Myhre (1903–1971), Norwegian chess player
Geir Myhre (born 1954), Norwegian former ice hockey player and coach
Hans Bernt Myhre (1817–?), Norwegian politician
Jan Eivind Myhre (born 1947), Norwegian historian and professor
Janet Myhre, American statistician
John Myhre, American Academy Award-winning production designer
Knut Myhre (born 1931), Norwegian politician
Kyle Tran Myhre, aka Guante, (born 1983), American hip hop artist, poet, activist, and educator
Lars Elton Myhre (born 1984), Norwegian alpine skier
Lise Myhre (born 1975), Norwegian cartoonist
Marius Myhre (born 1991), Norwegian badminton player
Nils Kristian Myhre (born 1971), Norwegian newspaper editor and former footballer
Øyvind Myhre (born 1945), Norwegian science fiction and fantasy author
Peter N. Myhre (born 1954), Norwegian politician
Petter Myhre (born 1972), Norwegian retired footballer and current coach and commentator
Rolf Myhre (born 1939), Norwegian politician
Thomas Myhre (born 1973), Norwegian football goalkeeper
Vera Myhre (1920–2000), Danish artist
Wencke Myhre (born 1947), Norwegian singer and actress

See also
Myhre syndrome, a rare genetic disorder
André Myhrer, (born 1983), Swedish alpine skier

Norwegian-language surnames